Kinley Dowling (born January 18, 1983), who performs under the stage name KINLEY, is a Canadian singer-songwriter and musician. She is a member of the band Hey Rosetta! and joined them in 2007. In 2016, she released her solo album Letters Never Sent. In 2018, she was nominated for four East Coast Music Awards, where she won Fan Choice Video of the Year (for her single "Microphone") and Rising Star Recording of the Year. She released her second album KINLEY in 2020, where it was nominated for Pop Recording of the Year at the 2021 East Coast Music Awards.

Career 

Dowling was born in Charlottetown, Prince Edward Island, Canada. Her recording career began when she was a music student at Dalhousie University. Dowling is based in Charlottetown.

Hey Rosetta!
The day after she graduated from Dalhousie University in 2007, Dowling started touring as the violinist with the rock group Hey Rosetta!. She toured with that group, based in St. John's, Newfoundland and Labrador, for ten years until the band started an indefinite hiatus in 2017.

Collaborations
In July 2011, Liam Corcoran and Dowling released their self-titled duo album The Express. This album, consisting of 11 songs, was produced by Dale Murray. The first three original compositions were written by Dowling and the remaining tracks were written by Liam Corcoran.

In June 2017, Dennis Ellsworth and Dowling released the duet album Everyone Needs to Chill Out. This album features songs written individually by Ellsworth and Dowling, as well as songs written together. Everyone Needs To Chill Out was nominated for six awards at the 2018 Music PEI Awards, and won the New Artist of the Year Award.

Solo career
Dowling released her debut solo album Letters Never Sent in October 2016. In 2017, the debut album won the "Female Solo Recording of the Year", "New Artist of the Year" and "SOCAN Songwriter of the Year" awards at Music PEI Week.

At the East Coast Music Awards in 2018, Letters Never Sent won the "Rising Artist of the Year" and "Fans' Choice Video of the Year" for "Microphone". "Microphone" received attention for its coverage of sexual assault and the song was incorporated into Grade 9 Health classes in PEI to help students understand consent.

Her second album, KINLEY, was released in 2020 and was preceded by the singles "Lightworkers", "Run With You", and "Washington". It was nominated for Pop Recording of the Year at the 2021 East Coast Music Awards, losing to Sorrey's In Full Bloom.

Personal life
Dowling is a first cousin of musician Liam Corcoran. The former front man for Two Hours Traffic encouraged Dowling to write her own original music.

Discography

Solo albums 
 Letters Never Sent (2016)
KINLEY (2020)

Solo singles 
 "Microphone" (2018)
"Lightworkers" (2019) 
"Run With You" (2019)
"Washington" (2020)

Notable collaborations 
 The Express by The Express (Liam Corcoran, Kinley Dowling, Dale Murray) (2011 album)
 Everyone Needs to Chill Out by Dennis Ellsworth and Kinley Dowling (Pyramid Scheme, 2017)

Other collaborations 

Dowling has recorded on over 50 albums. This is a partial list of other albums that she has played on.
 The Send Off (2009) - Rose Cousins
 Echoes (2009) - Jenn Grant
 We Are an Empire, My Dear (2009) - In-Flight Safety
 Self Explanatory (Classified album) (2009) - Classified (rapper)
 Honeymoon Punch (2011) - Jenn Grant
 20 Odd Years (2011) - Buck 65
 Coyote (Matt Mays album) (2012) - Matt Mays
 The Beautiful Wild (2012) - Jenn Grant
 Hazy Sunshine (2013) - Dennis Ellsworth 
 Compostela (album) (2014) - Jenn Grant
 The Bliss (2015) - Fortunate Ones

References

External links 
 
 
 

Canadian women singer-songwriters
Canadian singer-songwriters
Canadian rock violinists
Musicians from Charlottetown
1983 births
Living people
Canadian indie rock musicians
21st-century Canadian women singers
21st-century Canadian violinists and fiddlers
Canadian women violinists and fiddlers